Oswego City Hall is a historic city hall located at Oswego in Oswego County, New York.  It was built in 1870 and is a -story masonry, mansarded structure with a distinctive central clock tower.  It was designed by architect Horatio Nelson White (1814–1892).

It was listed on the National Register of Historic Places in 1973.

References

External links

City and town halls on the National Register of Historic Places in New York (state)
Government buildings completed in 1870
Buildings and structures in Oswego County, New York
Oswego, New York
Clock towers in New York (state)
National Register of Historic Places in Oswego County, New York